Adinah is a sub-district located in the Jabal Habashi District, Taiz Governorate, Yemen. ʿAdinah had a population of 9,019 according to the 2004 census.

References 

Sub-districts in Jabal Habashi District